Brazil–Paraguay relations are foreign relations between Brazil and Paraguay.

History

Brazil–Paraguay relations have improved greatly after Brazilian President Lula's decision in 2009 to triple its payments to Paraguay for energy from a massive hydro-electric dam on their border, ending a long-running dispute. Under the accord, Brazil will pay Paraguay $360m a year for energy from the jointly-operated Itaipu plant. Brazilian President Luiz Inácio Lula da Silva called it a "historic agreement" and the deal slated as a political victory for Paraguayan President Fernando Lugo. But deep-rooted problems remain in the relationship between the two countries, foremost of which are the unfavorable terms of the  1973 Itaipú Treaty under which Paraguay must sell hydro energy to Brazil as a derisory price and the presence of 300,000 Brazilian mainly soybean farmers in Paraguay, who pay minimal tax and have produced an exodus of small farmers from rural areas.  

Brazil is home to 43,731 Paraguayan citizens. Most Paraguayan Brazilians live in the state of São Paulo. In addition, Paraguay is home to hundreds of thousands of Brazilian immigrants, or Brasiguayos, whose presence has caused tension in border regions.

Paraguay Coup of 2012
In June 2012 Paraguay's senate voted 39–44 to dismiss president Fernando Lugo from office. The events have been criticized by leaders of many Latin American nations including Argentina and Venezuela. As a result, Paraguay was suspended from the South American Trade Bloc, which included Argentina, Brazil, Uruguay, and the then-recent addition of Venezuela. However, Paraguay reintegrated into the trade block after the suspension.

Recent relations 

Brazil–Paraguay relations are good. Paraguay’s president since 2018, Mario Abdo Benítez, had a close relationship with right-winger Brazilian President (2019-2022), Jair Bolsonaro. In February 2019, Brazilian President Jair Bolsonaro praised the late military strongman of Paraguay, Alfredo Stroessner, calling him "a man of vision." Bolsonaro made the comments during a ceremony at the Itaipu hydroelectric dam on the countries' shared border. At his side was Paraguayan President Mario Abdo Benitez.

Diplomatic missions

Of Brazil
 Asunción (Embassy and Consulate-General)
 Ciudad del Este (Consulate-General)
 Salto del Guairá (Consulate-General)
 Pedro Juan Caballero (Vice-Consulate)
 Encarnación (Vice-Consulate)
 Concepción (Vice-Consulate)

Of Paraguay
 Brasília (Embassy)
 Curitiba (Consulate-General)
 Río de Janeiro (Consulate-General)
 São Paulo (Consulate-General)
 Campo Grande (Consulate)
 Foz do Iguaçu (Consulate)
 Guaíra (Consulate)
 Paranaguá (Consulate)
 Ponta Porã (Consulate)
 Porto Alegre (Consulate)
 Santos (Consulate)

See also 
 Foreign relations of Brazil 
 Foreign relations of Paraguay

References

 
Paraguay
Bilateral relations of Paraguay